Kermia brunnea is a species of sea snail, a marine gastropod mollusk in the family Raphitomidae.

Description
The length of the shell attains 5 mm.

(Original description) The  fusiformly elongate shell is ornamented with transverse granular ribs, and fine longitudinal raised striae. The whorls are slightly convex. The aperture is elongate-oval. The siphonal canal is short. The colour of the shell is dark brown.

Distribution
This marine shell occurs off Hawaii.

References

 Severns, M. (2011). Shells of the Hawaiian Islands - The Sea Shells. Conchbooks, Hackenheim. 564 pp.

External links
 Moretzsohn, Fabio, and E. Alison Kay. "HAWAIIAN MARINE MOLLUSCS." (1995)
 
 Gastropods.com: Kermia brunnea

brunnea
Gastropods described in 1860